Russell B. Carroccio (April 28, 1931 – June 28, 1994) was an American football offensive lineman in the National Football League for the New York Giants and the Philadelphia Eagles.  He played college football at the University of Virginia.

Born and raised in Clifton, New Jersey, Carroccio attended Clifton High School.

References

1931 births
1994 deaths
Clifton High School (New Jersey) alumni
Players of American football from New Jersey
Sportspeople from Clifton, New Jersey
American football offensive linemen
Virginia Cavaliers football players
New York Giants players
Philadelphia Eagles players